Besarta Hisenaj (born 21 October 1998) is a Kosovan footballer who plays as a midfielder for 2. Frauen-Bundesliga club SG 99 Andernach and the Kosovo national team.

Career
Hisenaj has been capped for the Kosovo national team, appearing for the team during the UEFA Women's Euro 2021 qualifying cycle.

See also
List of Kosovo women's international footballers

References

External links
 
 
 

1998 births
Living people
Women's association football midfielders
Kosovan women's footballers
Kosovo women's international footballers
German women's footballers
German people of Kosovan descent